The Tessar is a photographic lens design conceived by the German physicist Paul Rudolph in 1902 while he worked at the Zeiss optical company and patented by Zeiss in Germany; the lens type is usually known as the Zeiss Tessar.

A Tessar comprises four elements in three groups, one positive crown glass element at the front, one negative flint glass element at the center and a negative plano-concave flint glass element cemented with a positive convex crown glass element at the rear.

History

Beginnings 
Despite common belief, the Tessar was not developed from the 1893 Cooke triplet design by replacing the rear element with a cemented achromatic doublet. Paul Rudolph designed the Anastigmat with two lenses cemented in 1890. Later, Rudolph thought that a narrow airgap in the form of a positive lens would correct the spherical aberration (as did HL Aldis in 1895) and that this device was much better than the lenses cemented. In addition, this allowed the photographers to have greater freedom when choosing the lenses. In 1899 he separated the lenses in the Anastigmat to produce the fourth element, a group of four Unar lenses (which replaced the two interfaces cemented by the aforementioned device). In 1902, he realized that the two cemented interfaces had many virtues, so he reinserted them in the back of his Anastigmat, maintaining the "air gap" of the previous part of the Unar, thus creating the Tessar design (from the Greek word τέσσερα (téssera, four) to indicate a design of four elements) of 1902. The frontal element of the Tessar, like that of the Anastigmat, had little power since its only function was to correct the few aberrations produced by the powerful posterior element. The set of interfaces cemented in the posterior element had 3 functions: to reduce the spherical aberration; reduce the overcorrected spherical-oblique aberration; reduce the gap found between astigmatic foci.

The first Tessar appeared with a maximum aperture of f/6.3, but by 1907, the maximum aperture had been increased to f/4.5. In 1930, Ernst Wandersleb and Willy Merté from Zeiss developed Tessar lenses with apertures of f/3.5 and f/2.8.

Millions of Tessar lenses have been created by Zeiss and other manufacturers, and are still produced as excellent intermediate aperture lenses. The famous 50mm f/3.5 Elmar lenses used in the first Leica cameras were of this type, designed by Max Berek in 1920. Actually, Zeiss has a large monopoly on this type of construction, because Rudolph's patent was very general. His only claim was:"A spherically, chromatically and astigmatically corrected objective consisting of 4 lenses separated by the diaphragm into two groups, each of two lenses, of which group one includes a pair of facing surfaces and the other a cemented surface, the power of the pair of facing surfaces being negative and that of the cemented surface positive".- Paul Rudolph on his device.

Modifications of the Tessar 
Many workers tried to copy the design of the Tessar lenses but due to the limitations of the patent, they could not. The simplest way was to use three cemented elements on the back instead of two. In 1913, many designs of this type appeared, for example "Ross Xpress" by J. Stuart and J.W. Hasselkus, "Gundlach Radar lens" and "Berthiot Olor" by Florian. In 1925, E. Wandersleb and W. Merté of Zeiss created "Biotessar" consisting of two elements cemented in the front and a single negative element and three cemented behind.

Common uses
Tessar are frequently found in mid-range cameras, as they can provide a very good optical performance at a reasonable price, and are often quite compact. They are also frequently used in photographic enlargers, as they provide more contrast than many competing lens designs due to the limited number of air-to-glass surfaces.

Focusing methods
All lenses can be focused by moving the lens assembly towards or away from the film ("unit focusing"), and the Tessar is no exception. Unit-focusing Tessars were used on higher-end cameras such as the Contaflex Super B, Rolleiflex TLR, and larger-format plate cameras such as the Maximar.

Some lenses, including Tessars, can be focused by moving lens elements relative to each other; this usually worsens optical performance to some extent, but is cheaper to implement. As the front element of the Tessar has three times the power of the whole lens, it must be moved one-third of the distance that the whole lens would need to move to focus at the same point. The large airspace between the first and second elements allows focusing by moving the front element only; as the displacement is small compared with the airspace, the adverse effect on image performance is not severe. The front-element-focusing Tessar, cheaper than a unit-focusing lens, was widely used in many midrange Zeiss Ikon cameras.

Tessar type lenses
The Tessar design patent was held by Zeiss for two decades, and licensed to Ross (optics) in the United Kingdom, Bausch & Lomb in the United States and to Krauss in France. Only licensed manufacturers were allowed to use the brand name "Tessar". However, Tessar-type lenses were widely made by many manufacturers under different trade names. The Minoxar 35/2.8 lens on the Minox M.D.C and GT-E is the fastest and widest Tessar type lens achieved so far by using lanthanum glass elements. The picture quality was outstanding. Other Tessar-type lenses include the Schneider Xenar, Agfa Solinar, Rodenstock Ysar, Kodak Ektar (some, but not all), KMZ Industar, Yashica Yashinon 80mm (twin-lens-reflex design), and Minolta Rokkor 75mm (twin-lens-reflex design).

After WW2 the Zeiss factory at Jena ended up in East Germany behind the Iron Curtain, and developed a popular camera named the 'Werra' after the river which runs through the town. This used Tessar lenses, which were marked as "Zeiss-Tessar", resulting in legal action from the Zeiss company in Western Germany. For a while the Werra Tessar lenses were marked simply as "T", but eventually they were allowed to market the lenses as "Carl Zeiss – Jena Tessar".

Leitz Elmar

It is sometimes thought that The Leitz Elmar 50/3.5 was a Tessar copy or clone. This is not the case. Although the lenses appear similar in layout, there is a lot more to the design and performance of a lens than simply the layout of the glass elements. The position of the stop, the optical characteristics of the glasses used for each element, the curvature of each lens surface, and the negative format that the lens is designed to cover, are all vital to the performance of the lens, and in the Leica lens these were all different from the Tessar. When the Leica was being developed, Oskar Barnack tried a 50 mm Tessar, but because it had been designed to cover only the 18×24 mm field of a cine frame, he found it inadequate for coverage of the Leica 24×36 mm format.  The lens designed by Max Berek for the Leica rangefinder camera was a modified Cooke triplet with five elements in three groups, the third group being three cemented elements, with the aperture stop in the first air space.  This lens, called the Elmax, gave good coverage of the 24×36 mm format and was used until improved optical glass allowed the third group to be simplified to a cemented pair when it was renamed Elmar.  It was not until Zeiss Ikon was developing the Contax camera to compete with the Leica that the Tessar was redesigned to cover a 24×36 mm negative.

Pro Tessar
The front element of the Tessar can be replaced to make a long-focus or wide-angle lens. In 1957 Carl Zeiss offered the long-focus Pro Tessar 115 mm f/4 and 85 mm f/4, and the wide-angle Pro Tessar 35 mm f/3,2 for use on the central-shutter SLR Zeiss Ikon Contaflex Super B cameras.

Other Tessar lenses / Vario-Tessar
Other Tessar lenses, for example for Nokia mobile phones, have only the name "Tessar" in common with the original Tessar. They are for example a 5-elements-in-1-group, aperture-less all-aspherical lens, as in the Nokia 808 Pureview and Nokia Lumia 800 camera.

Vario-Tessar lenses also only have the name "Tessar" in common with the original Tessar. The Vario-Tessar name has been used by Zeiss for various zoom lenses including that of the digital still cameras Sony Cyber-shot DSC-P100, DSC-P200 and DSC-W330 as well as the E-mount lenses such as Sony Alpha Carl Zeiss Vario-Tessar T* E 4/16-70mm ZA OSS (Sony SEL-1670Z) and Sony Alpha Carl Zeiss Vario-Tessar T* FE 4/16-35mm ZA OSS. Sony also uses Vario-Tessar lenses in their consumer camcorders such as the HDR-CX405 extending the wide angle view with 1.9mm to 57mm zoom range.

See also
Pancake lens

Planar
Sonnar
Biogon

Hologon
Elmar (lens)

Further reading

References

Photographic lens designs
Zeiss lenses